Júzcar is a village and municipality in the province of Málaga, part of the autonomous community of Andalusia in southern Spain. It is situated in the east of province in the Valle del Genal. The municipality is situated approximately 22 kilometres from Ronda and 113 from the provincial capital of Málaga. It belongs to the comarca of Serranía de Ronda.

The village had been one of the White Villages of Andalusia, with buildings traditionally whitewashed. In spring 2011, buildings in the village (including the church) were painted blue by Sony España to celebrate the premiere of the Smurfs movie. Approximately  of paint were used. While the original agreement with Sony España included painting the village white after its promotional ended, in December 2011, the village hall organised a special referendum vote for the village residents to determine if the village would remain blue or revert to white; the referendum results indicated the village would continue as blue with no date for reverting to white. The vote came after an estimated 95,000 tourists visited the village in the six months following the blue paint job, while the village had previously seen about 9,000 tourists annually.

As of December 2020, Júzcar remains, more or less, a blue village. While the Smurf name has been left in the past, the village is still commonly known with Spaniards as the Smurf Village, but officially for tourism purposes the village is referred to as "La Aldea Azul", the blue village.  The village was last painted blue in 2019, with paint provided by the provincial and village governments, but the building owners each responsible for the actual painting of the facades.

Climate

References

Municipalities in the Province of Málaga